uMhlabuyalingana Local Municipality is one of the five municipalities in the jurisdiction of uMkhanyakude District Municipality, situated in the northeastern part of KwaZulu-Natal Province in South Africa.  The municipality is one of the poorest municipalities in the country; it encompasses a World Heritage Site and several areas under environmental protection.

uMhlabuyalingana was approximately 98% rural in 2001, with a population of 140 963, according to Statistics South Africa.

Towns and major settlement nodes in the area include Emanguzi, Mbazwana, Kwangwanase, Maputa, Mboza, Mseleni and Skhemelele.

uMhlabuyalingana Local Municipality is made up of at least 99% black African people, most of whom are Zulu-speaking.  The population is very young:  44% are younger than 15, and 77% are younger than 35 years old.  Because of its youth, uMhlabuyalingana's population is particularly vulnerable to the impact of HIV/AIDS.

Areas of conservation and environmental interest within or adjacent to the uMhlabuyalingana area include the Tembe Elephant Park, iSimangaliso Wetland Park (a World Heritage Site), the Suni-Ridge Sand Forest Park, and the Phongolo Nature Reserve.

Missing funds
On 8 April 2009, the Inkatha Freedom Party (IFP), which controls the municipality, summoned its entire caucus to a meeting aimed at determining the veracity of reports alleging more than R3,000,000 (US$403,390) in funds unaccounted for.  Professor Themba Msimang, chairman of the party's Policy Oversight Committee (POC), and also current chair of South Africa's Heraldry Council, called for uMhlabuyalingana to accept a forensic audit. According to an IFP press release, Msimang stated that the party was "highly agitated" by the reports, "not simply because of the implication of corruption but also because it transgressed everything the party stands for... We will have to await the process that entails the municipality's council calling for such a forensic audit. I can assure you, though, our party will get to the bottom of this, and, if heads have to roll, so be it: they will."

Main places
The 2001 census divided the municipality into the following main places:

Politics 

The municipal council consists of thirty-nine members elected by mixed-member proportional representation. Twenty councillors are elected by first-past-the-post voting in twenty wards, while the remaining nineteen are chosen from party lists so that the total number of party representatives is proportional to the number of votes received. 

In the election of 1 November 2021 the African National Congress (ANC) lost its majority, winning a plurality of eighteen seats on the council.

References

External links
 Official website

Local municipalities of the Umkhanyakude District Municipality